DTG may refer to: 

DTG (rapper), or DejiTheGamer, British rapper featured in S1mba song "Rover"
 Date-time group, a set of characters used to express date and time
 Deutsche Treuhand-Gesellschaft, a German accounting firm that in 1979 merged with Klynveld Kraayenhof & Co.
 Dolutegravir, an antiretroviral drug used to treat HIV/AIDS
 Differential thermogravimetry, a differential thermal analysis technique
 Digital TV Group, UK members' association for digital television
 Direct to garment printing, a process of printing on textiles and garments
 Dovetail Games, a British video game developer and publisher
 Dynamic theory of gravity, a unified field theory developed by Nikola Tesla
 The ICAO Airport code for Dwight Airport